Empire of the Over-Mind (sometimes Empire of the Overmind) is an interactive fiction game written by Gary Bedrosian and published by Avalon Hill for the Apple II, Atari 8-bit, and TRS-80 in 1981. A version with an enhanced display for DOS by Bedrosian was published in 1986.

Contents
Empire of the Over-Mind is a text only adventure game in which the player must free a magical kingdom from the control of the evil computer Over-Mind.

Reception
In a 1984 COMPUTE! piece on adventure games, Selby Bateman wrote: "One very popular game for Avalon Hill has been its all-text adventure, Empire of  the OverMind [sic] for Apple II and Atari computers, which is still selling well, notes Jack Dodd, Avalon Hill's director of marketing."

Bill Seligman reviewed Empire of the Overmind in The Space Gamer No. 49. Seligman commented that "For the price of this primitive program, one could buy two-and-a-half Scott Adams all-text adventures or one full-color graphics adventure from On-Line. Not recommended."

References

External links
Electronic Games review
1984 Software Encyclopedia from Electronic Games
Review in The Addison Wesley Book Of Atari Software 1984
Another review in Electronic Games
Review in Compute!'s Guide to Adventure Games
Review in Page 6
 

1981 video games
1980s interactive fiction
Apple II games
Atari 8-bit family games
Avalon Hill video games
DOS games
TRS-80 games
Video games developed in the United States